Konstantinos Stavrothanasopoulos (born 6 February 1992) is a Greek professional footballer who plays as a right winger.

Career
Stavrothanasopoulos started his career at the youth teams of Panionios F.C, and was promoted to the first team in July 2011. In December 2011, he signed a professional three years contract with the club. After a loaned year in Thrasyvoulos F.C., Stavrothanasopoulos returned to Panionios and stayed there for two more years. In February 2015, he signed a contract with the Swedish Division 1 club Akropolis IF. 
He has also been a member of the Greece U19. He made one appearance in September 2011 against Montenegro U19.

On 8 December 2017, after two seasons with Akropolis IF, he transferred to Superettan club IK Frej for an undisclosed fee. On 18 February 2018, he scored in his debut in a 2–1 away Svenska Cupen win against Jönköpings Södra IF.

On 5 March 2019 he signed a 10-months contract with Veikkausliiga club VPS. On 13 June 2020, he signed a 6-months contract with Ettan Swedish club IFK Haninge. In October 2021, he moved to Fostiras F.C. in Gamma Ethniki. In August 2022, Stavrothanasopoulos joined GS Marko.

References

External links

1992 births
Living people
Greek footballers
Greece youth international footballers
Footballers from Agrinio
Association football wingers
Panionios F.C. players
Thrasyvoulos F.C. players
Akropolis IF players
IK Frej players
Vaasan Palloseura players
Fostiras F.C. players
Super League Greece players
Football League (Greece) players
Ettan Fotboll players
Superettan players
Veikkausliiga players
Greek expatriate footballers
Greek expatriate sportspeople in Sweden
Greek expatriate sportspeople in Finland
Expatriate footballers in Sweden
Expatriate footballers in Finland